Pomianowo may refer to:

Pomianowo, Masovian Voivodeship, Poland
Pomianowo, West Pomeranian Voivodeship, Poland

See also
Pomian (disambiguation)